Fantozzi alla riscossa ("Fantozzi to the Rescue") is a 1990 Italian comedy film directed by Neri Parenti. It is the seventh chapter in the Fantozzi film series of the unlucky clerk Ugo Fantozzi, played by its creator, Paolo Villaggio.

Plot 
New misadventures of Accountant Fantozzi, including managing the film career of his nephew Ughina; being juror in a mafia trial; taking lessons of violence by a hooligan; facing a marriage crisis and searching a new lover through a dating service.

Cast 
 Paolo Villaggio as Ugo Fantozzi
 Milena Vukotic as  Pina Fantozzi
 Gigi Reder as  Filini
 Plinio Fernando as  Mariangela Fantozzi / Uga Fantozzi
 Anna Mazzamauro as  Mrs. Silvani
 Luigi Petrucci as Psychoanalyst
 Paul Muller as Duke Count Francesco Maria Barambani 
  Pierfrancesco Villaggio 	 as Hooligan 
  Silvia Annichiarico as Juror
  Angelo Bernabucci as Cinecittà Producer

References

External links

1990 comedy films
1990 films
Films directed by Neri Parenti
Italian comedy films
1990s Italian films